Andover High School was a public high school in Bloomfield Township, Oakland County, Michigan, near Bloomfield Hills and in Greater Detroit. It was a part of the Bloomfield Hills School District. The school's final principal was Rob Durecka. The school teams were known as the Andover Barons.

In 2010, the decision was made to merge Andover and Lahser High schools and build a single high school on the current Andover property.

In 2013 it was merged into Bloomfield Hills High School, which is located on the former Andover campus. The new combined high school opened in the fall of 2015.

History
Andover High School, originally named Bloomfield Hills High School, opened in the fall of 1931.  It presided on Vaughan Road, built on land donated to the district by George Gough Booth. In 1936, Bloomfield Hills High School had its first graduating class of only eight students. Due to the expanding population growth in the area, a larger school was necessary.  This came into fruition in 1955 when Bloomfield Hills High School moved to its new location on Andover Road. However, sizing again became a problem, only this time a new school was built. In 1967, it was renamed Andover High School, as a second high school, Lahser, opened in the district. The two schools merged in 2013 to become the new Bloomfield Hills High School.

Academics
Over 98% of Andover's graduates attended college after graduation, and the actual graduation rate was about 97%.  Average SAT scores for Andover were (1233/1600), above the national average. Two Andover alumni have won the Rhodes Scholarship to study at the University of Oxford, in the UK. Wen Shi (Johns Hopkins University) won the award in 2003, and Abdul El-Sayed (University of Michigan) won it in 2008.  One Andover alumnus won the Goldwater Scholarship, Andrew Zureick (Dartmouth College), in 2012 for excellence in the sciences.

Sports

State Championships

Men's Soccer

 1978 - State Champions

Men's Track

 1937 - State Runner-Up
 1938 - State Champions
 1939 - State Champions
 1944 - State Runner-Up
 1948 - State Champions
 1949 - State Runner-Up
 1992 - State Runner-Up

Men's Golf

 1952 - State Runner-Up
 1962 - State Runner-Up
 1980 - State Champions
 1992 - State Champions

Men's Tennis

 1991 - State Runner-Up
 1992 - State Runner-Up
 1997 - State Champions
 1999 - State Runner-Up
 2002 - State Champions
 2004 - State Champions
 2005 - State Champions
 2006 - State Runner-Up
 2009 - State Runner-Up

Men's Swimming and Diving

 1984 - State Runner-Up
 1986 - State Champions
 1987 - State Runner-Up
 1990 - State Champions
 1991 - State Champions
 1992 - State Champions
 1993 - State Champions
 1994 - State Champions
 1995 - State Champions
 1996 - State Champions
 1997 - State Champions

Women's Swimming and Diving

 1980 - State Champions
 1981 - State Champions
 1982 - State Champions
 1983 - State Champions
 1984 - State Champions
 1985 - State Runner-Up
 1986 - State Champions

Notable alumni

 Lawrence Bacow, President of Harvard University
 Richard Bernstein, Michigan Supreme Court Justice
 Lisa Brown, Michigan state representative
 Rob Cantor, singer and guitarist for the band Tally Hall
 Zubin Sedghi, singer and guitarist for the band Tally Hall
 Jonathan Chait, writer
 Abdul El-Sayed, Public health advocate and candidate governor of Michigan in the 2018 Democratic Party primary
 Sheri Fink, Pulitzer Prize-winning journalist
 Dana Jacobson, sports news anchor
 Rick Lax, entertainer
 Jason Miller, an American rabbi and entrepreneur
 Jason Raznick, an American entrepreneur
 Marcus Sakey, writer & TV host
 Chad Smith, drummer for Red Hot Chili Peppers (moved to Lahser High School where he graduated in 1980)
 Alex Winston, musician

The Andover Shield
The Andover Shield was Andover High School's award-winning newspaper. In recent years, the newspaper and its staff have won many MIPA awards and was first honored with a Spartan award in 2007.

References

External links

Official Site
WBFH website
Official Andover Swim Team Site
Official Andover Robotics Team Site
The Andover Shield Newspaper Website

Public high schools in Michigan
Bloomfield Hills, Michigan
Schools in Bloomfield Township, Oakland County, Michigan
Educational institutions established in 1955
Educational institutions disestablished in 2013
1955 establishments in Michigan
2013 disestablishments in Michigan
High schools in Oakland County, Michigan